Padenia triseparata is a moth of the subfamily Arctiinae. It was described by Hubert Robert Debauche in 1938. It is found on Sulawesi.

References

Lithosiini
Moths described in 1938